Spofford is a city in Kinney County, Texas, United States. The population was 95 at the 2010 census.

Geography

Spofford is located in southern Kinney County at  (29.172681, –100.411388). It is on the east side of Texas State Highway 131, which leads north  to Brackettville, the county seat, and south  to U.S. Route 277 in the Rio Grande valley.

Demographics

As of the census of 2000,  75 people, 24 households, and 19 families resided in the city. The population density was 298.8 people per square mile (115.8/km). The 38 housing units averaged 151.4/sq mi (58.7/km). The  racial makeup of the city was 81.33% White, 18.67% fromother races. Hispanics or Latinos of any race were 52.00% of the population.

Of the 24 households, 50.0% had children under the age of 18 living with them, 66.7% were married couples living together, 8.3% had a female householder with no husband present, and 16.7% were not families. About 16.7% of all households were made up of individuals, and 16.7% had someone living alone who was 65 years of age or older. The average household size was 3.13 and the average family size was 3.45.

In the city, the population was distributed as 29.3% under the age of 18, 5.3% from 18 to 24, 30.7% from 25 to 44, 17.3% from 45 to 64, and 17.3% who were 65 years of age or older. The median age was 40 years. For every 100 females, there were 92.3 males. For every 100 females age 18 and over, there were 103.8 males.

The median income for a household in the city was $39,583, and for a family was $39,583. Males had a median income of $36,250 versus $11,250 for females. The per capita income for the city was $36,485. Around 5.3% of families and 11.8% of the population were living below the poverty line, including 17.4% of those under 18 and none of those over 64.

History

Spofford was named after C.K. Spofford, who opened a hotel in town shortly after the railroad came through in 1882. The town grew around the hotel and was granted a post office in 1884. By 1896, the town had its first school, and by 1900, it had 100 residents.

The Galveston, Harrisburg and San Antonio Railroad (later part of the Southern Pacific Railroad, and today part of the Union Pacific Railroad) had chosen Spofford over Brackettville. At Spofford, they laid a spur to Eagle Pass, and the main line continued west to Langtry. At various times, Spofford was a stop on the Sunset Limited.

The population reached the high-water mark of 373 people in the mid-1940s. After the school consolidations in the '40s, Spofford's students were bused to Brackettville. In 1961, the population was only 138, and it went as low as 54 people in the mid 1970s.

Education
Spofford is served by the Brackett Independent School District.

References

Cities in Kinney County, Texas
Cities in Texas